Joachim Illies (March 23, 1925 - June 3, 1982) was a German biologist, entomologist and author.

Biography
Joachim Illies studied biology at the University of Götting  and Kiel. He was an honorary professor for zoology at the University of Gießen and the leader of the Max-Planck-Institute of limnology in Plön.

Primarily he was engaged in limnological subjects. In addition to his scientific activities, as a councilor of the Evangelical Church in Germany he published around forty popular books on themes concerning anthropology and theology.

Books
 Adams Handwerk, Furche 1967
 Noahs Arche, Kosmos 1968
 Wissenschaft als Heilserwartung, Furche 1969
 Die Affen und wir, ro-ro-ro-tele 1970
 Zoologie des Menschen, Piper 1971
 Feigenblatt und Lorbeer, Schünemann 1971
 Die Sache mit dem Apfel, Herder 1972, mit Beiträgen von Heinrich Spaemann, Christa Meves, Ernst Bloch u.a.
 Für eine menschenwürdige Zukunft, Herder 1972
 Hoffnung auf Naturwissenschaft, Die Waage, Zürich 1972
 Biologie und Menschenbild, Freiburg im Breisgau, Basel, Wien (Herder) 1975, 
 Das Geheimnis des Lebendigen: Leben u. Werk des Biologen Adolf Portmann, München 1976 (Kindler), 
 Die andere Seite der Biologie, Freiburg im Breisgau, Basel, Wien 1978 (Herder), 
 Kulturbiologie des Menschen: Der Mensch zwischen Gesetz und Freiheit, München 1978 (Piper), 
 Das Geheimnis des grünen Planeten, Frankfurt / Main 1982 (Umschau-Verlag), 
 Der Jahrhundert-Irrtum: Würdigung und Kritik des Darwinismus, Frankfurt / Main 1983 (Umschau-Verlag),

Literature
  Brockhaus Enzyklopädie, Neunzehnte, völlig neu bearbeitete Auflage, Band 10, Seite 393, Artikel „Illies, Joachim“, Mannheim 1989, 
  Carsten Bresch: "Nachruf auf Joachim Illies", in AGEMUS, Juni 1982, p. 25 f, Freiburg im Breisgau

External links
 Joachim Illies in the German National Library

1925 births
1982 deaths
20th-century German biologists
German entomologists
20th-century German zoologists